Edward Payson Whittemore (May 26, 1933 – August 3, 1995) was an American novelist, the author of five novels written between 1974 and 1987, including the highly praised series Jerusalem Quartet. He had started his career as a case officer in the Central Intelligence Agency's Directorate of Operations (Asia, Middle East and Europe) between 1958 and 1967.

Biography and writing career
The youngest of five children, Whittemore was born on May 26, 1933 in Manchester, New Hampshire, USA to John Cambridge Whittemore (1889–1958), a commercial district manager for the New England Telephone and Telegraph Company, and his wife Elizabeth Payson Whittemore (née Prentiss; 1894–1985).  He graduated from Deering High School, Portland, Maine, in 1951, and went to Yale shortly after, where he obtained a degree in history.

He joined the Marines and served as an officer on a tour of duty in Japan. Approached by the relatively recently established CIA, he was recruited into the service, when it had many men from the Ivy League universities.  Working undercover as a reporter for The Japan Times from 1958 until 1967, Whittemore traveled throughout the Far East, Europe and the Middle East.

It was during this time that Whittemore began working on the novels for which he is probably best known.  These constitute the Jerusalem Quartet. His earlier book, Quin's Shanghai Circus (1974), contains the seeds of his series.

His books received mixed reviews. Reviewing Quin's Shanghai Circus (1974), Jerome Charyn of New York Times Book Review praised Whittemore's "ability to mythologize our recent past, to turn history into a mode of fiction …" J.S. in Time said that he introduced "freakish impossibility" and that his book "lurched."

Whittemore's Sinai Tapestry (1977) also received mixed reviews. Anthony Heilbut of The Nation compared him favorably to Pynchon, Nabokov and Fuentes, but argued that his writing was more "lucid" and that he achieved "the solidity of history itself." Erik Korn of Times Literary Supplement was much more critical. The second book of The Jerusalem Quartet, Jerusalem Poker, was also roughly received by some. Harper's Magazine praised this novel as well as its "amplification" of the previous one. On the other hand, science fiction author and critic Thomas M. Disch gave Jerusalem Poker a very negative review in the Times Literary Supplement, describing Whittemore as a Reader's Digest version of Pynchon. He said that more enthusiastic appreciations were a "litany of avant-garde hype." He described Whittemore as an "anti-writer" with a "genteel poverty of imagination."

Many writers and critics have lauded the novels' breadth and imaginative intensity in publications such as The New York Times Book Review, Harper's Magazine, The Nation, The Village Voice, Locus Magazine and The Magazine of Fantasy & Science Fiction.

The original editions failed to achieve commercial success; about 3,000 hardcover and 10,000 paperback copies of each novel were sold. Whittemore was jealous of his privacy and refused to give interviews to "unknown correspondents," an attitude that hampered his publisher's promotion effort.

Edward Whittemore spent the final years of his life in poverty.  He died on August 3, 1995 in New York City, shortly after being diagnosed with prostate cancer.

Reissues
Out of print for many years, all five books were reissued in 2002 by Old Earth Books. The Old Earth Books editions are now out of print, but Open Road Media announced plans to publish eBook editions of all five novels in July 2013.

Works
 Quin's Shanghai Circus (1974)

The Jerusalem Quartet
 Sinai Tapestry (1977)
 Jerusalem Poker (1978)
 Nile Shadows (1983)
 Jericho Mosaic (1987)

References

External links

 Jerusalem Dreaming, a tribute site

1933 births
1995 deaths
20th-century American novelists
American male novelists
United States Marine Corps officers
Yale College alumni
Writers from Manchester, New Hampshire
Writers from Portland, Maine
American expatriates in Israel
20th-century American male writers
Novelists from Maine
Deering High School alumni